The Smurfs 2 is a 2013 American 3D fantasy comedy film loosely based on The Smurfs comic book series created by the Belgian comics artist Peyo. It is the second film in the Smurfs film series and a sequel to the 2011 film The Smurfs, produced by Columbia Pictures, Sony Pictures Animation, Kerner Entertainment Company and Hemisphere Media Capital, and distributed by Sony Pictures Releasing. The film is directed by Raja Gosnell, who helmed the first, with all the main cast returning. New cast members include Christina Ricci and J. B. Smoove as members of the Naughties, and Brendan Gleeson as Patrick Winslow's stepfather.

The Smurfs 2 was released on July 31, 2013 to generally negative reviews from critics for poor attempts at humor, characters, plot, screenplay and perceived lack of fidelity to its source material. The film is dedicated to Jonathan Winters, who voiced Papa Smurf and died on April 11, 2013. A fully animated reboot titled Smurfs: The Lost Village was released on April 7, 2017, directed by Kelly Asbury with Sony and Kerner returning to produce the film while having an all new cast (with the exception of Frank Welker as Azrael).

Plot

In preparation for her birthday celebration, the Smurfs read the story of Smurfette, how she was created by Gargamel to destroy them, only for Papa Smurf to rescue her and turn her fully into a Smurf. Meanwhile, she is having nightmares about reverting to her original form and betraying her fellow Smurfs by turning them over to Gargamel. The Smurfs are preparing a surprise party, but as Smurfette tries to find out what her fellow Smurfs are planning, none of them are saying a word. She takes this to mean that everyone has forgotten her birthday.

In Paris, Gargamel and Azrael are now celebrities, amazing people with Gargamel's sorcery, but he is running low on the Smurf essence that gives him his magic powers. With his new creations, evil Smurf-like creatures called the Naughties, named Vexy and Hackus, Gargamel creates a portal to Smurf Village by using the Eiffel Tower as a conduit so that he can kidnap Smurfette as revenge on The Smurfs for previously defeating him and, through her, obtain Papa's secret formula for creating Smurfs. However, Gargamel is too large to go through the portal, so he sends Vexy through it to kidnap Smurfette.

The Smurfs witness the abduction of Smurfette and inform Papa, who uses his magic to create crystals that allow several of his Smurfs to travel directly to the residence of their human allies, Patrick and Grace Winslow, in New York City in order to seek his help to rescue Smurfette. Papa originally intends for Brainy, Hefty and Gutsy to use the crystals, but through an accident, Clumsy, Grouchy and Vanity use them instead. The Smurfs arrive in Patrick and Grace's apartment right after the celebration of their son Blue's fourth birthday where they meet Patrick's stepfather, Victor Doyle, who is a constant embarrassment to Patrick. The Smurfs soon discover Gargamel is in Paris and set off with the Winslows and Victor to find him.

Upon arrival in Paris, Patrick and Grace work with Victor to distract Gargamel during one of his performances, while the Smurfs sneak backstage in Gargamel's dressing room to look for Smurfette, only to discover what Gargamel is planning. At the same time, Smurfette escapes from her prison, and Vexy and Hackus chase after her. Vexy encourages her to become one of them, claiming that naughty is fun. Upon her return to Gargamel's hotel suite with the Naughties, Gargamel presents her with a tiny dragon wand as a feigned act of kindness. Smurfette still refuses to give Gargamel the formula until she sees the Naughties are dying due to a lack of Smurf essence. Faced without an alternative to save them, Smurfette writes the formula down and Gargamel uses it to turn the Naughties into real Smurfs. Immediately after they become Smurfs, Gargamel puts them into his Smurfalator so he can carry out the rest of his plan.

Meanwhile, Patrick, Victor and the Smurfs work together to rescue Smurfette. The Smurfs are soon captured and put into the Smurfalator, powering Gargamel's large-sized dragon wand. Patrick and Victor arrive just in time to destroy the Smurfalator together, causing an explosion of Smurf essence that destroys the written formula and frees the Smurfs from their cages. Everyone is blasted out of Gargamel's lair through a sewer hole where Patrick and Victor reunite with Grace and Blue. Gargamel reappears out of the sewer hole only to be blasted away by Smurfette with her new wand. He then falls onto the Notre Dame Cathedral, where he accidentally brings a stone gargoyle to life, which then throws him to the top of the Eiffel Tower where fireworks are then set off, sending him into the air. The Smurfs bid farewell to the Winslows, then return home with Vexy and Hackus to celebrate Smurfette's birthday.

In two post-credit sequences, Gargamel and Azrael are pulled into the portal, sending them back to their castle, and they later have a fight.

Cast

Live-action actors
 Hank Azaria as Gargamel, an evil wizard
 Mr. Krinkle as Azrael, Gargamel's cat
 Neil Patrick Harris as Patrick "Pat" Winslow, Victor's step-son
 Brendan Gleeson as Victor Doyle, Patrick's step-father, Grace's step-father-in-law and Blue's step-grandfather
 Jayma Mays as Gracie "Grace" Winslow, Patrick's wife, Blue's mother and Victor's step-daughter-in-law
 Jacob Tremblay as Blue Winslow, Patrick and Grace's son and Victor's step-grandson
 Nancy O'Dell as herself, a television interviewer

Voice actors
 Katy Perry as Smurfette
 Jonathan Winters as Papa Smurf
 Anton Yelchin as Clumsy Smurf 
 Christina Ricci as Vexy, a smart and mischievous Smurf-like creature called a "Naughty" created by Gargamel and Grouchy Smurf's love interest
 J. B. Smoove as Hackus, a funny and physical Smurf-like creature called a "Naughty" created by Gargamel
 Fred Armisen as Brainy Smurf
 Alan Cumming as Gutsy Smurf
 George Lopez as Grouchy Smurf/Positive Smurf
 John Oliver as Vanity Smurf
 Mario Lopez as Social Smurf
 Jimmy Kimmel as Passive Aggressive Smurf
 Frank Welker as Azrael
 Tom Kane as Narrator Smurf
 Paul Reubens as Jokey Smurf
 B. J. Novak as Baker Smurf
 Shaquille O'Neal as Smooth Smurf
 Shaun White as Clueless Smurf
 Jeff Foxworthy as Handy Smurf
 Gary Basaraba as Hefty Smurf
 Adam Wylie as Panicky Smurf
 Joel McCrary as Farmer Smurf
 Kenan Thompson as Greedy Smurf
 John Kassir as Crazy Smurf
 Kevin Lee as Party Planner Smurf

Production
On August 9, 2011, Sony Pictures Animation announced a sequel to be released on August 2, 2013, which was later rescheduled to July 31, 2013 (two years and two days after the release of its predecessor). Director Raja Gosnell and producer Jordan Kerner returned for the film. Katy Perry confirmed at the 2012 Kids' Choice Awards that she would be reprising her role as Smurfette. Sony began working on the sequel in early 2011 with writers J. David Stem, David N. Weiss, Jay Scherick and David Ronn. By early August 2011, the first draft of the script was completed. On April 26, 2012, Sony announced that the film went into production. Filming took place in Montreal, Quebec, Canada. The film also marked the last appearance of Jonathan Winters, who voiced Grandpa Smurf on the 1980s TV series and Papa Smurf in the first film. Winters died on April 11, 2013 (by then, work had already ended on this film).

On July 11, 2013, it was announced that Sofía Vergara's role was cut from the film. Gosnell, the director of the film, explained: "She came to Paris and did a tiny little cameo for us, but ultimately for story clarity we had to omit that scene. ... It just muddied things up a bit. So it was a sad day for us, but she'll always be part of our Smurfy family." Several scenes were filmed in the new film studios Cité du Cinéma founded by Luc Besson in Saint-Denis in France.

Release
The film was theatrically released in the United States on July 31, 2013. Sony teamed up with marketing partners in the United States and Canada to promote the film through McDonald's Happy Meals with a set of 16 toys during the summer of 2013. Sony also teamed up with Build-A-Bear Workshop to release three customized limited edition stuffed animals of Vexy, Hackus and Smurfette.

Home media
The Smurfs 2 was released on DVD, Blu-ray Disc and Blu-ray 3D on December 3, 2013. The 3D and Blu-ray combo packs also included a hand-drawn/computer-animated short film The Smurfs: The Legend of Smurfy Hollow. The film was released on Ultra HD Blu-ray on March 1, 2016.

Reception

Critical response
The review aggregator website Rotten Tomatoes reported a 14% approval rating with an average rating of 4/10, based on 94 reviews. The website's consensus reads, "Like its predecessor, Smurfs 2 may amuse small children, but it's largely an unambitious, charm-free collection of slapstick gags and one-liners." The rating put the film as the 16th on the list of worst reviewed films of 2013. Metacritic calculated a weighted average score of 34 out of 100 based on 30 critics, indicating "generally unfavorable reviews". Audiences polled by CinemaScore gave the film an average grade of "A−" on an A+ to F scale. The Smurfs 2 was nominated for a Golden Raspberry Award for Worst Prequel, Remake, Rip-off or Sequel.

Justin Lowe of The Hollywood Reporter said "Beyond a few chuckle-worthy one-liners and some amusing visual comedy, there's not much to engage adults, although the wee ones should be distracted enough." Matt Patches of Time Out New York gave the film two out of five stars, saying "Patient Adult Smurfs will be checking their watches as Excitable Child Smurfs lose themselves in the high jinks." Frank Lovece of Newsday gave the film two out of four stars, saying "Not Smurftastic, but not Smurfawful, either." Loren King of The Boston Globe gave the film two out of four stars, saying "That the mushroom- dwelling blue creatures still manage to be endearing even in their second big-screen extravaganza (in 3-D, no less) is about the best that can be said of "Smurfs 2." Kyle Smith of the New York Post gave the film one out of four stars, saying "They're as lethally uninteresting as Barney the Purple Dinosaur, though a Godzilla-style "Barney vs. Smurfs" is a movie I would pay to see, provided maximum destruction were promised."

Joe Williams of the St. Louis Post-Dispatch said "It's not exactly "Ratatouille," but this quasi-animated movie makes an amusing late-summer vacation from superheroes and shoot-'em-ups." Gregg Turkington of On Cinema gave the film five bags of popcorn, suggesting Jonathan Winters deserved an Oscar for the film and that it was the best performance of his career.

Other reviews were more agnostic regarding the film's quality. Mark Olsen of the Los Angeles Times gave the film two and a half stars out of five, saying "Right down to the brute functionality of its title, "The Smurfs 2" may be the platonic ideal of a major studio sequel - no markedly better or worse than the first and with just enough difference to lay claim to being something new."

Claudia Puig of USA Today gave the film one and a half stars out of four, saying "This insipid, and sometimes awkward, blend of animation, computer generation and live action wastes a ton of talent and lacks a true sense of whimsy." Jordan Hoffman of the New York Daily News gave the film two out of five stars, saying "Voicing Papa Smurf here turned out, alas, to be comedian Jonathan Winters' final role. (A crueler fate than Orson Welles signing off with 1986's animated "The Transformers: The Movie"? You be the judge.)" Alonso Duralde of The Wrap said "The Smurfs 2 will keep a child reasonably entertained for 105 minutes—but so will a large, empty cardboard box. The box is more likely to stimulate a child's imagination and less likely to contain jokes about testicles." Peter Howell of the Toronto Star gave the film one and a half stars out of four, saying "The Smurfs 2 has everything you hated about the first movie, and more."

Sean O'Connell of The Washington Post gave the film two out of five stars, saying "I found "The Smurfs 2" to be more enjoyable and far less obnoxious than [the original]. This, of course, is like saying having a cavity filled is preferable to a root canal, but in the dog days of the summer blockbuster season, beggars can't be smurfers." Peter Hartlaub of the San Francisco Chronicle gave the film zero stars out of four, saying "There's a dark and gratuitously negative vibe to "The Smurfs 2" that makes it unfit even for the undiscriminating young moviegoers that made the first one a hit." Bill Goodykoontz of The Arizona Republic gave the film two out of five stars, saying "There are a few laughs here and there, along with a couple of jokes for grown-ups uncomfortably squeezed in. But this is a movie made for two groups: small children and people who have fond memories of the TV show. For them, it'll be fun, and the assurance of a third "Smurfs" scheduled for 2015 will be welcome news." Nick Schager of The Village Voice said "Its tolerant messages remain buried beneath lame pop-culture references, hectic slapstick, fart jokes, and endless Smurf-puns that (Azaria's funny, over-the-top cartoon villainy aside) make one pine for the Smurfpocalypse."

Neil Genzlinger of The New York Times gave the film two out of five stars, saying "The movie doesn't have the wit of the first installment and seems as if it might be hard for young children to follow, though who knows with young children?" Owen Gleiberman of Entertainment Weekly gave the film a C, saying "The trouble with this stunted sequel is that the doughy, blobby-hatted Smurfs are mostly window dressing for an abrasive slapstick bash built around a tiresome kidnap plot." Bruce Ingram of the Chicago Sun-Times gave the film two out of five stars, saying "The Smurfs 2 probably isn't any worse than you might expect. On the other hand, it's almost certainly not any better. It's just a matter of figuring out how much punishment you're willing to endure for the sake of the small child you're taking to the movies." Kevin McFarland of The A.V. Club gave the film a D+, saying "The film undermines its rudimentary plot points at every turn with base humor. By marginally addressing the Smurfette Problem, Smurfs 2 is at least slightly superior to the absolutely dire first film, but it remains a series for kids whose parents can't just pop in a DVD of something better."

Box office
The Smurfs 2 grossed $71,017,784 in North America, and $276,527,576 in other countries, for a worldwide total of $347,545,360. Box Office Mojo values the film's budget at $105 million, while Deadline Hollywood reported that the film's negative cost was $146 million, with $21 million gained from the production benefits. In addition, Sony spent $46.3 million on the film's marketing in the United States, and $45.3 million in other countries (excluding Japan). Earning $200 million less than its predecessor, the film did not meet Sony's expectation, which was generally attributed to the original's negative reception and competition from another family sequel, Despicable Me 2.

In North America, the film debuted at #1 on its opening day, earning $5.2 million. The film opened to #3 in its first weekend, behind 2 Guns and The Wolverine, earning $18.2 million. Over its extended five-day weekend, it earned $27.8 million, below the original's three-day weekend ($35.6 million), and below Sony's projection of $35 million, which blamed too many PG-rated films in theatres.

Outside North America, the film debuted with $52.5 million from 43 countries. In Russia and Latin America, it performed better than the first film, while in Europe, it under-performed.

Music

Soundtrack

The Smurfs 2: Music from and Inspired By, the soundtrack of the film, was released on July 23, 2013. Britney Spears contributed an original song titled "Ooh La La", which is played at the film's credits. Many other artists were featured on the soundtrack, including Becky G, Owl City, Nelly Furtado, Austin Mahone, and G.R.L.

Score

The Smurfs 2 is the score of the film. Heitor Pereira composed the original score for the film, which was released on August 6, 2013, by Varèse Sarabande Records.

Video game
A video game based on the film, titled The Smurfs 2, was published by Ubisoft on July 23, 2013. Developed by Ubisoft Osaka (DS version only) and WayForward Technologies, it was released as an action-adventure platformer to Xbox 360, PlayStation 3, Wii and Wii U, and as an interactive storytelling book and collection of mini-games to Nintendo DS.

Future

Cancelled sequel
By May 2012, just a few weeks after production of The Smurfs 2 was announced, Sony Pictures Animation and Columbia Pictures had been already developing a script for The Smurfs 3, with writers Karey Kirkpatrick and Chris Poche. Initially set for a release in summer 2015, Sony announced in March 2014 that plans for The Smurfs 3 had been folded and instead, it would reboot the series with a completely computer-animated film.

Reboot

Directed by Kelly Asbury, the reboot titled Smurfs: The Lost Village, was released on April 7, 2017 to mixed reviews, but was seen by both critics and audiences as an improvement over the live action films.

References

External links

 
 
 
 
 
 

The Smurfs in film
2013 films
2013 3D films
2013 computer-animated films
2010s children's comedy films
2010s fantasy comedy films
American films with live action and animation
American 3D films
American children's animated comedy films
American fantasy comedy films
American sequel films
Animated films based on comics
2010s children's fantasy films
Columbia Pictures animated films
Columbia Pictures films
Films scored by Heitor Pereira
Films based on Belgian comics
Films directed by Raja Gosnell
Films set in New York City
Films set in Paris
Films shot in Montreal
Films with screenplays by Karey Kirkpatrick
Sony Pictures Animation films
Films about parallel universes
Films about wizards
3D animated films
2013 comedy films
2010s English-language films
2010s American films